Ebrahim Azizi (Born in Kermanshah) is an Iranian  politician.

He was a member and spokesman of the Guardian Council. He also served as a representative of Kermanshah in the Iranian parliament.

References

Living people
Members of the Guardian Council
Members of the 5th Islamic Consultative Assembly
YEKTA Front politicians
Year of birth missing (living people)
People from Kermanshah